The 2022 Wisconsin gubernatorial election was held on November 8, 2022, to elect the governor of Wisconsin. Incumbent Democratic governor Tony Evers won re-election to a second term, defeating Republican nominee Tim Michels. 

As Lieutenant Governor Mandela Barnes ran for the U.S. Senate in the concurrent election, a new Democratic running mate, state assemblywoman Sara Rodriguez, was nominated in the partisan primary. Barnes was the second lieutenant governor not to run with the incumbent governor since the state constitution was amended in 1967. The partisan primary was held on August 9, 2022, with businessman Tim Michels defeating former Lieutenant Governor Rebecca Kleefisch in the Republican primary. State senator Roger Roth received the Republican nomination for lieutenant governor.

This was the first gubernatorial election in Wisconsin since 2006 in which a Democrat won with an outright majority of the vote, the first since 1990 in which the winner was from the same party as the incumbent president, and the first since 1962 in which Wisconsin voted for a Democratic governor at the same time the party held the presidency. This was also the first gubernatorial election in the state since 1998 in which the winning candidate was of a different party than the winner of the concurrent U.S. Senate election.

Democratic primary

Governor

Nominee 
 Tony Evers, incumbent Governor (2019–present)

Disqualified 
 Job Edmond Hou-Seye, former alderman of Sheboygan (2015–2017)

Endorsements

Results

Lieutenant Governor

Candidates

Nominee
 Sara Rodriguez, state assemblywoman from the 13th district (2021–2023)

Eliminated in primary 
 Peng Her, CEO of Hmong Institute

Withdrawn
 Lena Taylor, state senator from the 4th district (2005–present) and former state assemblywoman from the 18th district (2003–2005) (ran for mayor of Milwaukee)
 David Bowen, state assemblyman from the 10th district (2015–present)

Declined
 Mandela Barnes, incumbent lieutenant governor (2019–2023) (ran for U.S. Senate)

Endorsements

Polling

Results

Republican primary

Governor

Nominee
 Tim Michels, co-owner of the Michels Corporation and nominee for the U.S. Senate in 2004

Eliminated in primary
 Adam J. Fischer, former police officer and businessman
 Rebecca Kleefisch, former Lieutenant Governor (2011–2019)
 Timothy Ramthun, state assemblyman for the 59th district

Disqualified
James Kellen
 Leonard Larson Jr.

Withdrawn
Kevin Nicholson, businessman, former member of the Wisconsin Board of Veterans Affairs and candidate for the U.S. Senate in 2018
Jonathan Wichmann, businessman (ran for lieutenant governor)

Declined
 Paul Farrow, chair of the Republican Party of Wisconsin (2021–present), Waukesha County Executive (2015–present) and former state senator from the 33rd district (2013–2015)
 Eric Hovde, businessman and candidate for the U.S. Senate in 2012
 Ron Johnson, U.S. Senator (2011–present) (ran for re-election)
 Chris Kapenga, President of the Wisconsin Senate (2021–present) and state senator from the 33rd district (2015–present) (ran for re-election)
John Macco, state assemblyman for the 88th district (2015–present) (ran for re-election; endorsed Kleefisch)
 Bill McCoshen, lobbyist
Reince Priebus, former White House Chief of Staff (2017), former chair of the Republican National Committee (2011–2017) and former chair of the Republican Party of Wisconsin (2007–2011)
Tommy Thompson, former Governor (1987–2001), former U.S. Secretary of Health and Human Services (2001–2005) and nominee for the U.S. Senate in 2012 (endorsed Michels)
 Robin Vos, Speaker of the Wisconsin State Assembly (2013–present) and state assemblyman for the 63rd district (2005–present) (ran for re-election)
Scott Walker, former Governor (2011–2019) (endorsed Kleefisch)

Endorsements

Polling
Graphical summary

Results

Lieutenant Governor

Candidates

Nominee
Roger Roth, state senator from the 19th district (2015–present)

Eliminated in primary 
David D. King, businessman and perennial candidate
Will Martin, former Wisconsin Department of Workforce Development official
Patrick Testin, state senator from the 24th district (2017–present)
David Varnam, mayor of Lancaster (2016–present)
Jonathan Wichmann, businessman
Kyle Yudes, activist

Withdrawn
Ben Voelkel, former aide to U.S. Senator Ron Johnson

Endorsements

Results

Independents

Candidates

Withdrawn
Joan Ellis Beglinger, retired nurse and hospital administrator (remained on ballot; endorsed Michels)
Running mate: N/A
Jess Hisel, engineer and Air Force veteran
Running mate: N/A

General election

Predictions

Endorsements

Polling
Aggregate polls

Graphical summary

Tony Evers vs. Rebecca Kleefisch

Tony Evers vs. Tim Ramthun

Tony Evers vs. Kevin Nicholson

Tony Evers vs. Jonathan Wichmann

Tony Evers vs. generic Republican

Debates

Results

Results by county

Counties that flipped from Republican to Democratic
 Door (largest municipality: Sturgeon Bay)

Counties that flipped from Democratic to Republican
 Crawford (largest municipality: Prairie du Chien)
 Grant (largest municipality: Platteville)
 Kenosha (largest municipality: Kenosha)
 Richland (largest municipality: Richland Center)

See also
 2022 United States gubernatorial elections
 2022 Wisconsin elections

Notes

Partisan clients

References

External links
Official campaign websites
 Tony Evers (D) for Governor
 Jess Hisel (I) for Governor
 Tim Michels (R) for Governor

Official lieutenant gubernatorial campaign websites
 Sara Rodriguez (D) for Lieutenant Governor
 Roger Roth (R) for Lieutenant Governor

2022
Wisconsin
2022 Wisconsin elections